The Symphony No. 28 in C major, K. 200/189k, by Wolfgang Amadeus Mozart is his last piece in the "Salzburg series". The date of composition is uncertain; it probably dates from 17 or 12 November 1774 or 1773.

The symphony was written early in Mozart's oeuvre, following the example of the twenty-fifth symphony.

Structure

This symphony is scored for 2 oboes, 2 horns, 2 trumpets and strings.

It is written in four movements:
Allegro spiritoso, 
Andante in F major, 
Menuet – Trio, Allegretto 
Presto,

References

External links 

28
1773 compositions
Compositions in C major